Sir Charles Edward Henry Hobhouse, 4th Baronet, TD, PC, JP (30 June 1862 – 26 June 1941) was a British Liberal politician and officer in the Territorial Force. He was a member of the Liberal cabinet of H. H. Asquith between 1911 and 1915.

Background and education
He was the third child and only son of Sir Charles Parry Hobhouse, 3rd Baronet, and his wife Edith Lucy Turton, daughter of Sir Thomas Turton, 2nd Baronet, born at Dormansland, Surrey. He was educated at Eton College, and matriculated at Christ Church, Oxford in 1880. He then attended the Royal Military College, Sandhurst.

Military career
Hobhouse was commissioned from Sandhurst as a lieutenant in the King's Royal Rifle Corps (KRRC) on 23 August 1884, and served with the regiment until he resigned from the Regular Army on 7 May 1890 to enter politics. However, he became a captain in the part-time 7th Battalion, KRRC, (the Royal 2nd Middlesex Militia) on 17 April 1897. When a new 3rd Volunteer Battalion of the Gloucestershire Regiment was formed in Bristol during the Second Boer War, he was commissioned as a major in the unit, succeeding to its command with the rank of lieutenant-colonel on 5 April 1903. He continued in that role when the battalion became the 6th Battalion, Gloucestershire Regiment in the Territorial Force in 1908. Hobhouse retired from the command on 5 April 1911, but on the death of the 6th Gloucesters'  Honorary Colonel, Earl Roberts, shortly after the outbreak of World War I, he was appointed to succeed him on 24 December 1914. Hobhouse continued to be the 6th Gloucesters' Hon Colonel for the rest of his life, the battalion being converted into 44th Royal Tank Regiment in 1938.

Political career
Hobhouse's first attempt to get elected was at North Buckinghamshire. He was Liberal Member of Parliament for Devizes between 1892 and 1895 and for Bristol East between 1900 and 1918. He was a Parliamentary Private Secretary at the Colonial Office from 1892 to 1895 and a Church Estates Commissioner from 1906 to 1907.

Hobhouse was appointed to his first ministerial post in 1907 when Sir Henry Campbell-Bannerman made him Under-Secretary of State for India. The Hobhouse Commission he headed recommended a cautious expansion of the panchayat raj system in Indian villages. The commission's report influenced later legislation for India. He then served under H. H. Asquith as Financial Secretary to the Treasury from 1908 to 1911. He was a member of Asquith's cabinet as Chancellor of the Duchy of Lancaster between 1911 and 1914 and as Postmaster-General between 1914 and 1915. In 1909 he was sworn of the Privy Council.

Apart from his career in national politics, Hobhouse was an Alderman on Wiltshire County Council from 1893 to 1924. He succeeded his father as fourth Baronet in 1916. At the Coupon election in 1918 he lost his seat, as did Asquith, McKenna, Runciman, Simon, Samuel and McKinnon Wood. In 1922 Hobhouse stood again in North Buckinghamshire but came third, behind both Conservative and Labour.

Hobhouse, long associated with Bristol, was appointed President of the Western Counties Liberal Federation from 1924 to 1935 and President of the National Liberal Federation from 1926 to 1930.

Personal life 
Hobhouse married first in 1890 Georgina Fleetwood Fuller (Lady Nina), daughter of George Pargiter Fuller of Neston Park; she died in 1927. He married again in 1931, to Aimee Gladys Brendon, widow of Benjamin Adams Brendon, and daughter of David Charles Ballinger Griffith. He had no children by either marriage. They lived at Monkton Farleigh until he died on 26 June 1941, aged 78.

See also 

 Under-Secretary of State for India
 Financial Secretary to the Treasury
 Chancellor of the Duchy of Lancaster
 Postmaster General

References

Primary sources

Secondary sources

External links
 

1862 births
1941 deaths
People educated at Eton College
Alumni of Christ Church, Oxford
King's Royal Rifle Corps officers
Gloucestershire Regiment officers
Baronets in the Baronetage of the United Kingdom
Chancellors of the Duchy of Lancaster
Members of the Privy Council of the United Kingdom
Members of Wiltshire County Council
United Kingdom Postmasters General
Liberal Party (UK) MPs for English constituencies
Presidents of the Liberal Party (UK)
UK MPs 1892–1895
UK MPs 1900–1906
UK MPs 1906–1910
UK MPs 1910
UK MPs 1910–1918
Charles
Liberal Party (UK) councillors
Church Estates Commissioners
Territorial Force officers